Iulian Andrei (born July 28, 1974 in Bucharest) is a former Romanian rugby union player. He played as a scrum-half.

Club career
During his career, Andrei played mostly for Steaua București in Romania and for București Wolves, a Romanian professional rugby union team based in Bucharest that competed in the European Rugby Challenge Cup competition.

International career
Andrei gathered 22 caps for Romania, from his debut in 2003 against Czech Republic to his last game in 2008 against Russia. He was a member of his national side for the 6th  Rugby World Cup in 2003, where he played three matches in Pool A against Ireland, Argentina and Namibia.

Honours
Steaua București
 SuperLiga: 2002–03, 2004–05, 2005–06
 Romanian Cup: 2006, 2007

References

External links
 
 
 

1978 births
Living people
Romanian rugby union players
Romania international rugby union players
Rugby union scrum-halves
CSA Steaua București (rugby union) players
București Wolves players
Rugby union players from Bucharest